In the fields of computational linguistics and probability, Trigrams, are a special case of the n-gram, where n is 3.

Trigram may also refer to:
 Bagua (called Eight Trigrams in English), a set of eight symbols in Taoist cosmology
 A three-letter acronym
 Trigram (FIFA), three letter codes used by the football association FIFA

See also
 Trigram search
 Digram (disambiguation)
 Trigraph (disambiguation)